MacCracken Hall is a women’s residence hall on Miami University’s campus in Oxford, Ohio.  Built in 1957 and completed in the spring of 1961, MacCracken Hall was named after Miami Graduate Henry Mitchell MacCracken. It is located on Miami University’s Central Quad, and currently houses four sorority chapters: Alpha Chi Omega, Chi Omega, Kappa Alpha Theta, and Kappa Delta.

Construction and Planning
MacCracken Hall was built by Knowlton Construction, with architect Cellarius & Hilmer in the mid-1900s. The West Wing was opened in September 1957; while the Central Wing and East Wing were under construction, the women’s dormitory was called Center Hall. After the hall was fully completed in the spring of 1961, it was renamed MacCracken Hall, after Henry Mitchell MacCracken. The entire hall cost $1.69 million, with a square footage of 76,940 and a maximum capacity of 275 people. It was built with three chimneys, has three and a half stories plus a basement, and was built in brick.

History
Before MacCracken Hall was on Miami University’s campus, a temporary housing unit, called Miami Lodges, was constructed in the spot where MacCracken Hall is currently located. Miami Lodges was constructed in 1947 to house approximately 600 men who came to campus after WWII. MacCracken Hall was built a decade later, and full construction was completed in 1961. It was dedicated on the morning of Saturday, September 16, 1961 at 11. The ceremony was held to dedicate all of the buildings built between 1940-1962 facing the South Quadrangle of the South Campus of Miami University. MacCracken Hall initially housed six sorority houses, two large recreation rooms, two living rooms, and a large dining facility.

Henry Mitchell MacCracken

MacCracken Hall was named after Henry Mitchell MacCracken, “one of America’s outstanding nineteenth century educators” and an 1857 graduate of Miami University. MacCracken was born in Oxford, Ohio on September 28, 1840, and he entered Miami University in 1852, when he was only 12 years old. He graduated before his 17th birthday in 1857, began teaching at Grove Academy in Cedarville, Ohio, and soon became the principal of schools in South Charleston, Ohio in 1858.

In 1860, MacCracken moved to Xenia, Ohio and began theological studies at the United Presbyterian Seminary. He completed his education at the Princeton Theological Seminary in 1863, then traveled Europe to pursue philosophical and theological studies abroad. When he returned to America in 1868, he became the Pastor of First Presbyterian Church in Toledo, Ohio. MacCracken was chosen to the chancellorship of the Western University of Pennsylvania at Pittsburgh in 1881, and in 1896, he became the chancellor and was on the faculty for University of the City of New York, renamed in 1896 as New York University. He also co-authored a history of New York University in 1901, and in 1900, MacCracken conceived the idea for the Hall of Fame for Great Americans.

In retirement, Henry MacCracken devoted his life to travel, and studied educational conditions around the world. He delivered several historical addresses to different countries while he was abroad. MacCracken died in Orlando, Florida on December 24, 1918, at the age of 78.

MacCracken Today
Today, MacCracken Hall is located on Central Quad, and along with the sorority suites, houses a Learning Technologies Center.  It is located amidst many dining options; it is connected to Market Street at MacCracken, is next to Scott Hall, and is very close to Harris Dining Hall and Hamilton Dining Hall. It currently houses four sorority chapters: Alpha Chi Omega, Chi Omega, Kappa Alpha Theta and Kappa Delta. Not only are these sorority suites located in MacCracken Hall, but the girls in the youngest pledge class of these sororities also live in the dormitory. The current address of MacCracken is: 500 Center Drive, Oxford, Ohio.

MacCracken Hall has recently become featured on the Miami University Student ID Cards. Students can use these cards to swipe for many things, including getting into their residence halls, rooms, and to pay for food on campus.

References

Buildings and structures of Miami University
University and college dormitories in the United States